NA-106 Toba Tek Singh-II is a constituency for the National Assembly of Pakistan. All political parties operate in this City. This city is located in Central Punjab and is considered one of the most educated and talented cities of Pakistan due to literacy rate and its geography.

Members of Parliament

2018-2022: NA-112 Toba Tek Singh-II

Election 2002 

General elections were held on 10 Oct 2002. Muhammad Farhan Latif an Independent candidate won by 81,607 votes.

Election 2008 

General elections were held on 18 Feb 2008. Mohammad Junaid Anwar Chaudhry of PML-N won by  84,061 votes.

Election 2013 

General elections were held on 11 May 2013. Mohammad Junaid Anwar Chaudhry of PML-N won by 117,534 votes and became the  member of National Assembly.

|}

Election 2018 
General elections were held on 25 July 2018.

See also
NA-105 Toba Tek Singh-I
NA-107 Toba Tek Singh-III

References

External links
 Election result's official website

NA-093